Jurie Els is a South African singer with a great number of albums and singles to his credit. He is owner of Stetson Music. Between 1994 and 2003, he was an artist and music producer with Sony, Johannesburg, South Africa.

Els started singing professionally in 1994 after winning the popular South African TV quiz programme Noot vir Noot in 1991. He wrote the lyrics to hundreds of South African songs recorded by some of the most popular artists including Sonja Herholdt, Rina Hugo, Gé Korsten, Carike Keuzenkamp, Bobby Angel, Robbie Klay, OTH, Joanna Field, Caroline du Preez, Nadine and Patricia Lewis. He has to date 37 CD and DVD releases and total sales of over half a million units. Most of his albums were released on BMG and later Sony BMG. Two of his albums (Vat-Vat and Duet met Patricia Lewis) have gone platinum and five gold as a recording artist. He has also won many awards as music producer and songwriter.

Personal life
In 2005 Els married the highjump world champion Hestrie Cloete. Their daughter Chrizette was born in 2006 and their son Jason John in 2008.

Els was involved in a high profile court case after ex child star singer Robbie Klay in 2008 alleged sexual molestation by Els when Klay was between 11 and 16. The allegations first appeared in Beeld in February 2008. The Pretoria High Court trying the case found the evidence insufficient, Judge Chris Eksteen stating that Klay was a "very poor witness who misled and deceived the court and had a money motive". Klay's claims were dismissed in December 2009 acquitting Els on all charges of sexual molestation. Earlier the Supreme court had ordered a ban on publication of details of the alleged incidents. Major media outlets Huisgenoot, You and Media24, defying the court's publication ban, were successfully sued by Els and eventually sanctioned and fined.

Els went on to release eight more albums/greatest hit compilations after the 2009 court case, Klay none. Klay left South Africa and now lives in Los Angeles.

Els and his family relocated to New Zealand in March 2010 and they now live in Bayview, Auckland on the North Island. Els retired from the music business in 2016 and now owns a small company (Retro Records) that buys and sells vinyl records.

Hestrie, his wife, is a property manager. They own three properties in the Auckland area and are currently developing some land outside the historical village of Puhoi which Els is believed to have bought after a final court case/settlement.

Discography
Jurie Els albums / DVDs and "sell-thru" videos:

1994: Soveel Drome, Stetson Music
1994: Laat My Weet, BMG
1995: Vat-Vat (certified platinum), BMG
1996: Vat-Vat Vol. 2: K-K-Kyk na my! (certified gold), BMG
1997: Vat-Vat Vol. 3: My Deure Staan Oop (certified gold), BMG
1997: Ek Hoor As U Roep (certified gold), BMG
1998: Vat-Vat 4: Dans, Dans Met My!, BMG
1998: Hoe Sê Mens Dankie: Treffers op Video (sell-thru video), BMG
1998: Duet met Patricia Lewis (certified platinum), BMG
1999: Neem My T'rug (compilation album)
1999: Die Hart Van ´n Wenner, BMG
2000: Verbly jou in die Here, BMG
2000: Sewe Reënboë, Stetson Music
2001: Goud (certified gold, BMG
2001: Sonvanger, Stetson Music
2002: Goud 2, BMG
2003: Gospel 21 Treffers, BMG
2004: 10 Uit 10, Hoezit
2005: Jurie & Hestrie: Die Troue & 10 Musiekvideo's (DVD), Sony BMG
2004: Treffers, Sony BMG
2005: 18 Lekker Kinderliedjies (with Magda Greyling), Hoezit
2005: Honderd Bewonderd, Stetson Music
2006: Ek Bid, Sony BMG
2006: Is Jy Seker?, Maranatha
2007: Stille Rivierstroom: 16 Country Gunstelinge, Stetson Music
2007: Net Jy (compilation album), Stetson Music
2007: n Dans Met Pa: 25 Grootste Treffers (DVD), Sony
2007: Collections, Sony
2008: 40 Goue Treffers: Dankie Suid-Afrika, Stetson Music / SMD
2011: Voorbegin: Vat-Vat 5, Stetson Music / SMD
2011: SA Country Gold: The Very Best of Jurie Els (compilation album), EMI
2012: Vertrou Net en Glo: 21 Liedjies van Geloof, Hoop en Liefde, EMI
2013: Spring Bobbejaantjie: 23 Beste Kinderliedjies (with Magda Greyling), EMI
2014: Beach House in the Blue Mountains (duet album with Alan Garrity), Universal
2014: Super 12 Treffers, Next Music
2015: Stil Verby: 48 Hoogtepunte van 21 Jaar, Universal
2015: 20 Goue Treffers'', Select / Sony

References

External links
 

20th-century South African male singers
21st-century South African male singers
Date of birth missing (living people)
Living people
Year of birth missing (living people)